Soltankənd (also, Soltankend) is a village and municipality in the Ismailli Rayon of Azerbaijan.  It has a population of 534.

References 

Populated places in Ismayilli District